Aimé Trantoul (13 April 1908 – 27 February 1986) was a French cyclist. He competed in the team pursuit event at the 1928 Summer Olympics.

References

External links
 

1908 births
1986 deaths
French male cyclists
Olympic cyclists of France
Cyclists at the 1928 Summer Olympics